Diuris laevis, commonly known as the nanny goat orchid, is a rare species of orchid that is endemic to the south-west of Western Australia. It has between four and eight leaves and up to six pale yellow flowers which usually have reddish-brown markings. It has an unusually short dorsal sepal and wide labellum and is relatively common between Bunbury and Albany.

Description
Flowering occurs in October and November, more prolifically after fire.

Taxonomy and naming
Diuris laevis was first formally described in 1882 by Robert FitzGerald and the description was published in The Gardeners' Chronicle. The specific epithet (laevis) is a Latin word meaning "smooth", "polished" or "bald".

Distribution and habitat
The nanny goat orchid grows in winter-wet areas and in swamps, often in large numbers between Bunbury and Albany in the Esperance Plains, Jarrah Forest and Warren biogeographic regions.

Conservation
Diuris laevis is classified as "not threatened" by the Western Australian Government Department of Parks and Wildlife.

References

External links

laevis
Endemic orchids of Australia
Orchids of Western Australia
Plants described in 1882